java-gnome is a set of language bindings for the Java programming language for use in the GNOME desktop environment. It is part of the official GNOME language bindings suite and provides a set of libraries allowing developers to write computer programs for GNOME using the Java programming language and the GTK cross-platform widget toolkit.

Development 

Originally released on 08.10.1999 as version 0.2, it included the first bindings for Gnome and GTK. Up until version 2.0, java-gnome was written by a project team. The current version 4.0 was originally an internal project of Operational Dynamics, a change management consultancy group. 

From 1999, the so-called 2.X series was the main project. After being abandoned by the main team for a time, the project was given to a new developer in 2006, due to development problems that came from many maintenance issues.

The last release of 2.0 versions (which continued the same project from version 0.2) was version 2.16.2 (called the 2.x series). The coverage of these series never made it past GTK 2.6. This update was declared as “end of life” for the old project and was no longer maintained, and any contribution patches for versions older than 4.0 are no longer accepted.

Both 2.0 and 4.0 updates have similar style of coding, while package spaces, classes, and method names are different. Internals of project were changed from version 4.0, so they can't be accessed publicly.

Currently, the project is maintained by "Java-gnome hackers". The leader of this latest team is Andrew Cowie, one of the principal architects for the java-gnome project.

Functions 
Java-gnome uses Java programming language and Java based class system for creation of GUI parts. Each implemented package has a different function; packages used in version 4.0 are:

 GTK - The widget toolkit itself.
 GDK - Contains low level drawing primitives. The majority of drawing is done by Cairo.
 Glib and Gobject - Containers for the rest of infrastructure that allow the use of OOP.
 Pango - Text layout engine.
 ATK - Accessibility toolkit that allows extra control with computer controls.
 GtkSourceView - Source code highlighter.
 LibNotify - Warning notifier.
 GtkSpell - Spellchecker.
 LibUnique - Library that helps to maintain one working instance of an application.

Support 
Java-gnome is only supported in Linux and Unix distributions, unlike most other GTK bindings, that are supported by other systems. Distribution specific instructions are available for:

 Gentoo linux
 Arch linux
 Debian linux
 Ubuntu linux 

Semi-finished instructions are available for Open Solaris and Fedora Core Linux distributions.

Licensing 
Java-gnome is free software released under the terms of the GNU General Public License version 2.

Example 
To compile a java-gnome class it's necessary to add the gtk-4.1.jar jar in the classpath. The jar is available on Debian (and all Debian-based distributions) in the libjava-gnome-java package, which can be found in the official repositories (the jar is installed under the /usr/share/java path). 

package org.wikipedia.javagnome.example;

import org.gnome.gdk.Event;
import org.gnome.gtk.Gtk;
import org.gnome.gtk.Widget;
import org.gnome.gtk.Window;
import org.gnome.gtk.WindowPosition;
/**
 * Java-Gnome GTK Example
 * inspired official site java-gnome.sourceforge.net
 */
public class GdkSimple extends Window {
    public GdkSimple() {
        setTitle("Example");
        connect((DeleteEvent)(source, event) -> {
            Gtk.mainQuit();
            return false;
        });
        setDefaultSize(250, 150);
        setPosition(WindowPosition.CENTER);
        show();
    }

    public static void main(String[] args) {
        Gtk.init(args);
        new GdkSimple(); 
        Gtk.main(); 
    } 
}

See also

 GTK
 Clutter

References

External links
 The java-gnome language bindings project

GNOME libraries
Free computer libraries
GTK language bindings
Java (programming language) libraries
Widget toolkits